Susan Webber is an American politician. She currently serves as a Democratic member of the Montana Senate for District 8. Previously, she was a member of the Montana House of Representatives for District 16.

References

Living people
21st-century American politicians
21st-century American women politicians
Native American state legislators in Montana
Women state legislators in Montana
Democratic Party members of the Montana House of Representatives
Democratic Party Montana state senators
Year of birth missing (living people)
Native American women in politics